The Mauser Model 1902 was a Mauser bolt-action rifle, designed for Mexico. It was similar to the Mauser Model 1895 but used the Gewehr 98 action.

Design 
The Model 1902 was an upgraded Model 1895, the standard rifle of the Mexican Army at the beginning of the 20th century. The improvements were derived from the German Gewehr 98, such as the use of three locking lugs and a gas protection on the bolt. It fired the 7×57mm Mauser and accepted the Model 1895 bayonet. Two contract were signed in 1902 and 1906 by the Mexican general Bernardo Reyes. They were produced by Loewe Berlin, Steyr and DWM. 38,000 DWM-made rifles were delivered, and 40,000 more made by Steyr.

Mexican Mauser Model 1910 
The Mexican Mauser Model 1910 or Mauser Mexicano Modelo 1910 was a locally-made Model 1902. To reduce the country dependency on foreign suppliers, the Fabrica Nacional de Cartuchos and the Fabrica Nacional de Armas were created with the help of foreign technicians. A Model 1910 carbine, similar to the Model 1895 carbine, was also produced. 8,000 bayonets originally produced for the Mondragón rifle were adapted for the Mauser 1910. The Model 1902 and 1910 saw combat use during the Mexican Revolution. Production of the Model 1910 was slowed down because of the fall of the Díaz government in 1911 and it was supplemented by the Steyr Model 1912 Mauser. Nevertheless, 40,000 were produced until 1934. The Model 1910 also saw service in the Spanish Civil War where 20,000 were sent to aid the Spanish Republicans.

See also 
 Mexican Mauser Model 1936
 Mexican Mauser Model 1954

References 

 
 

Mauser rifles
Rifles of Mexico
Weapons and ammunition introduced in 1902
7×57mm Mauser rifles